Madurai is a major city in the Indian state of Tamil Nadu. It is the cultural capital of Tamil Nadu and the administrative headquarters of Madurai District. As of the 2011 census, it was the third largest urban agglomeration in Tamil Nadu after Chennai and Coimbatore and the 44th most populated city in India. Located on the banks of River Vaigai, Madurai has been a major settlement for two millennia and has a documented history of more than 2500 years. It is often referred to as "Thoonga Nagaram", meaning "the city that never sleeps".

Madurai is closely associated with the Tamil language. The third Tamil Sangam, a major congregation of Tamil scholars, is said to have been held in the city. The recorded history of the city goes back to the 3rd century BCE, being mentioned by Megasthenes, the Greek ambassador to the Mauryan Empire, and Kautilya, a minister of the Mauryan emperor Chandragupta Maurya. Signs of human settlements and Roman trade links dating back to 300 BCE are evident from excavations by Archeological Survey of India in Manalur. The city is believed to be of significant antiquity and has been ruled, at different times, by the Pandyas, Cholas, Madurai Sultanate, Vijayanagar Empire, Madurai Nayaks, Carnatic kingdom, and the British East India Company British Raj.

The city has a number of historical monuments, with the Meenakshi Temple and the Thirumalai Nayakkar Mahal being the most prominent. Madurai is an important industrial and educational hub in South Tamil Nadu. The city is home to various automobile, rubber, chemical and granite manufacturing industries.

Madurai has important government educational institutes such as the Madurai Medical College, Homeopathic Medical College, Madurai Law College, Agricultural College and Research Institute. Madurai city is administered by a municipal corporation established in 1971 as per the Municipal Corporation Act. The city is also the seat of a bench of the Madras High Court. The Madurai Bench has been functioning since 2004.

Etymology
According to Iravatham Mahadevan, a 2nd-century BCE Tamil-Brahmi inscription refers to the city as matiray, an Old Tamil word meaning a "walled city".

Madurai is one of the many temple towns in the state which is named after the groves, clusters or forests dominated by a particular variety of a tree or shrub and the same variety of tree or shrub sheltering the presiding deity. The region is believed to have been covered with Kadamba forest and hence called Kadambavanam. The city is referred by various names including "Madurai", "Koodal",  "Malligai Maanagar", "Naanmadakoodal" and "Thirualavai". The word Madurai may be derived from Madhura (sweetness) arising out of the divine nectar showered on the city by the Hindu god Siva from his matted hair. Another theory is that Madurai is the derivative of the word Marutham, which refers to the type of landscape of the Sangam age. A town in the neighbouring Dindigul district is called Vada Madurai (North Madurai) and another in Sivagangai district is called Manamadurai. The different names by which the city has been referred to historically are listed in the 7th-century poem Thiruvilayaadal Puraanam written by Paranjothi Munivar. Vaishnava texts refer to Madurai as the "southern Mathura", probably similar to Tenkasi (southern Kashi).

Koodal means an assembly or congregation of scholarly people, referring to the three Tamil Sangams held at Madurai. Naanmadakoodal, meaning the junction of four towers, refers to the four major temples for which Madurai was known for. Tevaram, the 7th- or 8th-century Tamil compositions on Shiva by the three prominent Nayanars (Saivites), namely Appar, Sundarar and Thirugnanasambandar, address the city as Thirualavai.

History

Madurai is mentioned in the great book Mahavamsa, that in the 6th century BCE, Prince Vijaya(BCE 543–505) married the daughter of King Pandu of Madurai and 700 men of prince Vijaya married 700 maidens from Madurai as their wives. The princess and maidens were sent to Sri Lanka with valuable items by ships and they landed in MahaTittha, present-day Mannar.

Madurai has been inhabited since at least the 3rd century BCE. Megasthenes may have visited Madurai during the 3rd century BCE, with the city referred as "Methora" in his accounts. The view is contested by some scholars who believe "Methora" refers to the north Indian city of Mathura, as it was a large and established city in the Mauryan Empire. Madurai is also mentioned in Kautilya's (370–283 BCE) Arthashastra. Sangam literature like Maturaikkāñci records the importance of Madurai as a capital city of the Pandyan dynasty. Madurai is mentioned in the works of Roman historians Pliny the Younger (61 – c. 112 CE), Ptolemy (c. 90 – c. CE 168), those of the Greek geographer Strabo (64/63 BCE – c. 24 CE), and also in Periplus of the Erythraean Sea.

After the Sangam age, most of present-day Tamil Nadu, including Madurai, came under the rule of the Kalabhra dynasty, which was ousted by the Pandyas around 590 CE. The Pandyas were ousted from Madurai by the Chola dynasty during the early 9th century. The city was fought over between the Cholas and the Pandyas during the 12th century, changing hands several times, until the early 13th century, when the second Pandyan empire was established with Madurai as its capital. After the death of Kulasekara Pandian (1268–1308 CE), Madurai came under the rule of the Delhi Sultanate. The Madurai Sultanate then seceded from Delhi and functioned as an independent kingdom until its gradual annexation by the Vijayanagara Empire in 1378 CE. Madurai became independent from Vijayanagar in 1559 CE under the Nayaks. Nayak rule ended in 1736 CE and Madurai was repeatedly captured several times by Chanda Sahib (1740 – 1754 CE), Arcot Nawab and Muhammed Yusuf Khan (1725 – 1764 CE) in the middle of the 18th century.

In 1801, Madurai came under the direct control of the British East India Company and was annexed to the Madras Presidency. The British government made donations to the Meenakshi temple and participated in the Hindu festivals during the early part of their rule. The city evolved as a political and industrial complex through the 19th and 20th centuries to become a district headquarters of a larger Madurai district. In 1837, the fortifications around the temple were demolished by the British. The moat was drained and the debris was used to construct new streets – Veli, Marat and Perumaal Mesthiri streets. The city was constituted as a municipality in 1866 under the Town Improvement Act of 1865. The British government faced initial hiccups during the earlier period of the establishment of municipality in land ceiling and tax collection in Madurai and Dindigul districts under the direct administration of the officers of the government. The city, along with the district, was resurveyed between 1880 and 1885 CE and subsequently, five municipalities were constituted in the two districts and six taluk boards were set up for local administration. Police stations were established in Madurai city, housing the headquarters of the District Superintendent.

It was in Madurai, in 1921, that Mahatma Gandhi, pre-eminent leader of Indian nationalism in British-ruled India, first adopted the loin cloth as his mode of dress after seeing agricultural labourers wearing it. Leaders of the independence movement in Madurai included N. M. R. Subbaraman, Karumuttu Thiagarajan Chettiar and Mohammad Ismail Sahib. The Temple Entry Authorization and Indemnity Act passed by the government of Madras Presidency under C. Rajagopalachari in 1939 removed restrictions prohibiting Shanars and Dalits from entering Hindu temples. The temple entry movement was first led in Madurai Meenakshi temple by independence activist A. Vaidyanatha Iyer in 1939.

In 1971, the municipality of Madurai was upgraded to a Municipal Corporation.

Architecture

Madurai is built around the Meenakshi Temple, which acted as the geographic and ritual centre of the ancient city of Madurai. The city is divided into a number of concentric quadrangular streets around the temple. Viswanatha Nayak (1529–64 CE), the first Madurai Nayak king, redesigned the city in accordance with the principles laid out by Shilpa Shastras (Sanskrit: , also anglicised as silpa sastra meaning rules of architecture) related to urban planning. These squares retain their traditional names of Aadi, Chittirai, Avani-moola and Masi streets, corresponding to the Tamil month names and also to the festivals associated.

The temple prakarams (outer precincts of a temple) and streets accommodate an elaborate festival calendar in which dramatic processions circumambulate the shrines at varying distances from the centre. The temple chariots used in processions are progressively larger in size based on the size of the concentric streets. Ancient Tamil classics record the temple as the centre of the city and the surrounding streets appearing liken a lotus and its petals. The city's axes were aligned with the four-quarters of the compass, and the four gateways of the temple provided access to it. The wealthy and higher echelons of the society were placed in streets close to the temple, while the poorest were placed in the fringe streets. With the advent of British rule during the 19th century, Madurai became the headquarters of a large colonial political complex and an industrial town; with urbanisation, the social hierarchical classes became unified.

Geography and climate

It has an average elevation of 134 metres. The city of Madurai lies on the flat and fertile plain of the river Vaigai, which runs in the northwest–southeast direction through the city, dividing it into two almost equal halves. The Sirumalai and Nagamalai hills lie to the north and west of Madurai. The land in and around Madurai is utilised largely for agricultural activity, which is fostered by the Periyar Dam. Madurai lies southeast of the western ghats, and the surrounding region occupies the plains of South India and contains several mountain spurs. The soil type in central Madurai is predominantly clay loam, while red loam and black cotton types are widely prevalent in the outer fringes of the city. Paddy is the major crop, followed by pulses, millet, oil seed, cotton and sugarcane.

As is typical for Tamil Nadu, Madurai has a tropical savanna climate (Köppen Aw/As), although it borders closely upon a hot semi-arid climate (BSh).

Madurai is hot and dry for eight months of the year. Cold winds are experienced during February and March as in the neighbouring Dindigul. The hottest months are from March to July. The city experiences a moderate climate from August to October, tempered by heavy rain and thundershowers, and a slightly cooler climate from November to February. Fog and dew are rare, occurring only during the winter season. Being equidistant from mountains and the sea, it experiences similar monsoon pattern with Northeast monsoon and Southwest monsoon, with the former providing more rain during October to December. The average annual rainfall for the Madurai district is about 85.76 cm.

A study based on the data available with the Indian Meteorological Department on Madurai over a period of 62 years indicate rising trend in atmospheric temperature over Madurai city, attributed to urbanisation, growth of vehicles and industrial activity.

Demographics

According to 2011 census based on pre-expansion limits, the area covered under the Madurai Municipal Corporation had a population of 1,017,865 with a sex-ratio of 999 females for every 1,000 males, much above the national average of 929. A total of 100,324 were under the age of six, constituting 51,485 males and 48,839 females. Scheduled Castes and Scheduled Tribes accounted for 6.27% and 0.31% of the population respectively. The average literacy of the city was 81.95%, compared to the national average of 72.99%. The urban agglomeration of Madurai had a population of 1,465,625, and is the third largest in Tamil Nadu and the 31st in India.

According to the religious census of 2011, Madurai had 85.83% Hindus, 8.54% Muslims, 5.18% Christians and 0.47% others. Tamil is the main language, and the standard dialect is the Madurai Tamil dialect, and is spoken by 89.0% of the population. Saurashtra, a language related to Gujarati, is the largest minority language which is spoken by 5.4% of the population. Other significant minority languages include Telugu (2.7%) and Urdu (1.5%). Roman Catholics in Madurai are affiliated with the Roman Catholic Diocese of Madurai, while Protestants are affiliated with the Madurai-Ramnad Diocese of the Church of South India.

In 2001, Slum-dwellers comprise 32.6 per cent of the total population, much higher than the national average of 15.05 per cent. The increase in growth rate to 50 per cent from 1971 to 1981 is due to the city's upgrade to a municipal corporation in 1974 and the subsequent inclusion of 13 Panchayats into the corporation limits. The decline in the population growth rate between 1981 and 2001 is due to the bifurcation of Madurai district into two, Madurai and Dindigul in 1984, and the subsequently of part of the city into the Theni district in 1997. The compounded annual growth rate dropped from 4.10 per cent during 1971–81 to 1.27 per cent during 1991–2004.

Administration and politics

The municipality of Madurai was constituted on 1 November 1866 as per the Town Improvement Act of 1865. The municipality was headed by a chairperson and elections were regularly conducted for the post except during the period 1891 to 1896, when no elections were held due to violent factionalism. During the early years of independent India, the Madurai municipality was dominated by reformists of the Indian National Congress. Madurai was upgraded to a municipal corporation on 1 May 1971 as per the Madurai City Municipal Corporation Act, 1971. It is the second oldest municipal corporation in Tamil Nadu, after Chennai. The functions of the municipality are devolved into six departments: General, Engineering, Revenue, Public Health, Town planning, and the Computer Wing. All these departments are under the control of a Municipal Commissioner, who is the supreme executive head. The legislative powers are vested in a body of 100 members, one each from the 100 wards. The legislative body is headed by an elected Mayor assisted by a Deputy Mayor. The corporation received several awards in 2008 for implementing development works.

The city of Madurai is represented in the Tamil Nadu Legislative Assembly by six elected members, one each for the Madurai East, Madurai West, Madurai North, Madurai Central, Madurai South and Thirupparankundram constituencies. Most of Madurai city comes under the Madurai Lok Sabha constituency and elects a member to the Lok Sabha, the lower house of the Parliament of India, once every five years. From 1957, the Madurai parliament seat was held by the Indian National Congress seven times in the 1962–67, 1971–77, 1977–80, 1980–84, 1984–89, 1989–91 and 1991 elections. The Communist Party of India (Marxist) won the seat three times during 1967–71, 1999–2004 and 2004–09 general elections. The Communist Party of India (1957–61), Tamil Maanila Congress (Moopanar) (1996–98), Janata Party (1998), Dravida Munnetra Kazhagam (2009–2014) and All India Anna Dravida Munnertra Kazhagam (2014–2020) have each won once. Part of the city which falls under Thirupparankundram assembly constituency comes under the Virudhunagar Lok Sabha constituency.

Law and order is enforced by the Tamil Nadu Police, which, for administrative purposes, has constituted Madurai city as a separate district. The district is divided into four sub-divisions, namely Thallakulam, Anna Nagar, Thilagar Thidal and Town, with a total of 27 police stations. The Madurai city police force is headed by a Commissioner of police, assisted by Deputy Commissioners. Enforcement of law and order in the suburban areas are handled by the Madurai district police. In 2008, the crime rate in the city was 283.2 per 100,000 people, accounting for 1.1 per cent of all crimes reported in major cities in India, and it was ranked 19th among 35 major cities in India. As of 2008, Madurai recorded the second highest SLL (Special and Local Laws) crimes, at 22,728, among cities in Tamil Nadu. However, Madurai had the second lowest crime rate at 169.1 of all the cities in Tamil Nadu. The city is also the seat of a bench of the Madras High Court, one of only a few outside the state capitals of India. It started functioning in July 2004.

Transport

The National Highways NH 7, NH 45B, NH 208 and NH 49 pass through Madurai. The state highways passing through the city are SH-32, SH-33 and SH-72, which connect various parts of Madurai district. Madurai is one of the seven circles of the Tamil Nadu State Highway network. Madurai is the headquarters of the Tamil Nadu State Transport Corporation (Madurai) and provides local and inter city bus transport across seven districts namely Madurai, Dindigul, Theni, and Virudhunagar. Madurai has four major bus stands, namely, Mattuthavani Integrated Bus Terminus (MIBT), Arappalayam, Palanganatham and Periyar Bus stand. There are 12,754 registered three-wheeled vehicle called auto rickshaws which are commercially available for renting within the city. Over the government operated city buses that are used for public transport, there are 236 registered private mini-buses that support local transportation.

Madurai Junction is an important railway junction in southern Tamil Nadu and constitutes a separate division of the Southern Railway zone. There are direct trains from Madurai connecting the important cities in Tamil Nadu like Chennai, Coimbatore, Kanyakumari, Tiruchirappalli, Tirunelveli, Karaikudi, Mayiladuthurai, Rameswaram, Thanjavur and Virudhachalam. Madurai has rail connectivity with important cities and towns in India.

Madurai International Airport, first used by the Royal Air Force in World War II in 1942., is located 12 kilometers from the city. The airport was declared a customs airport in 2012 allowing limited number of international flights. It offers domestic flights to some cities in India and international services to Colombo, Dubai and for Singapore on a daily basis started by Air India Express since February 2018.  The carriers operating from the airport are Air India, Air India Express, SpiceJet, IndiGo and SriLankan Airlines. The airport handled 842,300 passengers between April 2015 and March 2016.

Education

Madurai has been an academic centre of learning for Tamil culture, literature, art, music and dance for centuries. All three assemblies of the Tamil language, the Tamil Sangam (about the 3rd century BCE to the 3rd century CE), were said to have been held at Madurai. Tamil poets of different epochs participated in these assemblies, and their compositions are referred to as Sangam literature. During the third Tamil sangam, the comparative merit of the poets was decided by letting the works float in the lotus tank of the temple. It was believed that a divine force would cause the work of superior merit to float on the surface, while the inferior ones would sink.

The American College is the oldest college in Madurai, and was established in 1881 by American Christian missionaries. The Lady Doak College, established in 1948, is the oldest women's college in Madurai. Thiagarajar College (established in 1949), Madura College (established in 1889), Fatima College is a women's general degree college (established in 1953), Sourashtra College (established in 1967) and M.S.S. Wakf Board College (established in 1964), Tamil Nadu Polytechnic College ( established in 1946), are the oldest educational institutions of the city. Madurai Kamaraj University (originally called Madurai University), established in 1966, is a state-run university which has 109 affiliated arts and science colleges in Madurai and neighbouring districts. There are 47 approved institutions of the university in and around the city, consisting of autonomous colleges, aided colleges, self-financing colleges, constituent colleges, evening colleges and other approved institutions.

There are seven polytechnical schools and five Industrial training institutes (ITIs) in Madurai, with the Government ITI and the Government Polytechnic for Women being the most prominent of them all. There are two government medical institutes in Madurai, Madurai Medical College and Homoeopathic Medical College, Thirumangalam and 11 paramedical institutes. There are fifteen engineering colleges in Madurai affiliated to Anna University, with the Thiagarajar College of Engineering being the oldest. The Madurai Law College, established in 1979, is one of the seven government law colleges in the state. It is administered by the Tamil Nadu Government Department of Legal Studies, and affiliated with the Tamil Nadu Dr. Ambedkar Law University. There are three teacher training institutes, two music colleges, three management institutes and 30 arts and sciences colleges in Madurai. The agricultural college and research institute in Madurai, started in 1965 by the state government, provides agricultural education to aspirants in the southern districts of Tamil Nadu. There are a total of 369 primary, secondary and higher secondary schools in the city.

Economy

Madurai was traditionally an agrarian society, with rice paddies as the main crop. Cotton crop cultivation in the regions with black soil in Madurai district was introduced during the Nayaka rule during the 16th century to increase the revenue from agriculture. The paddy fields cultivated in the Vaigai delta across Madurai North, Melur, Nilakottai and Uthamapalayam are known as "double-crop paddy belts". Farmers in the district supplement their income with subsidiary occupations like dairy farming, poultry-farming, pottery, brick making, mat-weaving and carpentry. Madurai is famed for its jasmine plantations, called "Madurai Malli", primarily carried out at the foothills of Kodaikanal hills and traded at the Madurai morning flower market. An average of 2,000 farmers sell flowers daily at the flower market.

With the advent of Small Scale Industries (SSI) after 1991, the industrialisation of Madurai increased employment in the sector across the district from 63,271 in 1992–93 to 166,121 persons in 2001–02. Madurai is one of the few rubber growing areas in South India, and there are rubber-based industries in Madurai. Gloves, sporting goods, mats, other utility products and automobile rubber components are the most produced items by these industries. Automobile manufacturers are the major consumers of rubber components produced in the city. There are numerous textile, granite and chemical industries operating in Madurai.

Madurai is promoted as a tier II city for IT and Industry. kappalur which is sub-urban of Madurai is business hub for automotive industries such as KUN BMW, Isuzu, Volkswagen, Toyota, Mahindra, Tata, Maruti Suzuki, Mitsubishi, Ashok Leyland, Jeep, Fiat India (FCA). The government has created Utchapatti-Thoppur satellite Township in Kappalur. Small Industries Development Corporation Kappalur has many polymer and houseware manufacturing units.some software companies have opened their offices in Madurai. Software Technology Parks of India, an agency of the Government of India, has authorised several such companies to receive benefits under its national information technology development program. The state government proposed two IT-based Special Economic Zones (SEZ) in Madurai, and these have been fully occupied by various IT companies, HCLTech and Honeywell have their own campuses in ELCOT IT Park in Madurai.

Religious sites

Meenakshi Amman Temple is a historic Hindu temple located on the south side of the Vaigai River in Madurai, which is one of the most prominent landmarks of the city. It is dedicated to Parvati known as Meenakshi and her consort, Shiva as Sundareswarar. There are also two golden sculptured vimana (shrines) over the sanctum of the main deities. The temple is a significant symbol for Tamils and has been mentioned since antiquity in Tamil literature, though the present structure was built between 1623 and 1655 CE. The temple attracts 15,000 visitors a day and around 25,000 during Fridays. There are an estimated 33,000 sculptures in the temple.

Koodal Azhagar Temple is a Vishnu temple located in the city. The temple is the first among the six holy abodes of Murugan, the Arupadai Veedu, literally "Six Battle Camps", and one of the most visited tourist spots in Madurai. The temple has a wide range of Hindu gods carved on the walls.

The deity, Kallazhagar, is believed to be the brother of Meenakshi, the presiding deity at the Meenakshi temple. The festival calendars of these two temples overlap during the Meenakshi Thirukalyanam festival. Pazhamudircholai, one of the other six abodes of the Hindu god Murugan, is located atop the Solaimalai hill.

Kazimar Big Mosque is the first Muslim place of worship in the city. It was constructed under the supervision of Kazi Syed Tajuddin, believed to be a descendant of the prophet Muhammed. He came from Oman and received the piece of land from the Pandya ruler, Kulasekara Pandiyan during the 13th century. It is claimed to be the oldest Islamic monument in Madurai. The dargah of Madurai Hazrats called as Madurai Maqbara is located inside the mosque. Tirupparankunram Dargah is the grave of an Islamic saint who came from Jeddah; his festival is celebrated during Rajab every Hijri year.

Goripalayam Mosque is located in Gorippalayam, the name of which is derived from the Persian word Gor, meaning Grave. The graves of Hazrat Sulthan Alauddin Badhusha, Hazrat Sulthan Shamsuddeen Badhusha and Hazrat Sulthan Ghaibuddeen Badhusha are found here. The urus festival of this dargah is held on 15th night of the Islamic month of Rabi al-awwal on every hijri year. St. Mary's Cathedral is the seat of the Roman Catholic Archdiocese of Madurai. Samanar Malai and Panchapandavar Malai are important Jain centres.

Culture and tourism

Madurai is popularly called Thoonga Nagaram meaning the city that never sleeps, on account of the active night life. The city attracts a large number of tourists from within the country and abroad. About 9,100,000 tourists visited Madurai in 2010, out of which foreigners numbered 524,000. The palace complex of Thirumalai Nayak Palace was constructed in the Indo-Saracenic style by Thirumalai Nayakar in 1636 CE. It is a national monument maintained by the Tamil Nadu Archaeological Department. The daily sound and light show organized by the department explains the virtues of King Thirumalai and the features of the palace. The palace of Rani Mangamma has been renovated to house one of the five Gandhi Sanghralayas (Gandhi Memorial Museum, Madurai) in the country. It includes a part of the blood-stained garment worn by Gandhi when he was assassinated by Nathuram Godse. A visit by Martin Luther King Jr. to the museum inspired him to lead peaceful protests against discrimination.

The Eco park, situated in Tallakulam, features fountains and lighting in trees using optical fibres. Rajaji children park, maintained by the Madurai Municipal Corporation, is situated between the Gandhi museum and the Tamukkam grounds – it has a visitor average of 5,000 per day during holidays and 2,000–3,000 on working days. MGR Race Course Stadium is an athletic stadium which has a synthetic track and a swimming pool. Several National Meets are held here. It also hosts several international and national level Kabbadi Championships. Railway grounds at Arasaradi, Medical college grounds & Madura College Grounds are the full fledged cricket stadiums in the city.

The people of Madurai celebrate numerous festivals, which include Meenakshi Tirukkalyanam, the Chittirai Festival and the Car Festival. The annual 10 day Meenakshi Tirukalyanam festival, also called Chittirai festival, celebrated during April–May every year attracts 1 million visitors. Legend has it that Hindu god Vishnu, as Alagar, rode on a golden horse to Madurai to attend the celestial wedding of Meenakshi (Parvati) with Sundareswarar (Shiva). During the Cradle festival, the festive idols of Meenakshi and Sundareswarar are taken in procession to a mirror chamber and set on a rocking swing for nine days. Avanimoolam festival is celebrated during the month of September when the 64 sacred games of Hindu god Shiva, thiruvilayadal are recited. The Thepporchavam festival or float festival is celebrated in the month of January – February, on the full moon day of Tamil Month Thai to celebrate the birth anniversary of King Thirumalai Nayak. The decorated icons of the Meenakshi and her consort are taken out in a procession from the Meenakshi Temple to the Mariamman Teppakulam. The icons are floated in the tank on a raft decked with flowers and flickering lamps.

Jallikattu is the most popular historical sport in Tamil Nadu, which is a part of the Pongal festival (harvest festival) celebrated during January. The bull taming event is held in the villages surrounding Madurai when people from the neighbouring villages throng the open grounds to watch man and bull pitting their strength against each other. Although the event was banned by the Supreme Court of India in 2014, large protests in 2017 led to the sport's reinstatement. Santhanakoodu festivals in Madurai are celebrated on various days during the Islamic calendar year to commemorate Islamic saints.

Media and utility services

The city hosts several radio stations, including the state-owned All India Radio and private channels like Hello FM, Radio Mirchi, Suryan FM and Radio City. The Hindu, The New Indian Express and The Times of India are the three principal English-language daily newspapers which have Madurai editions. Deccan Chronicle, though not printed in the city, is another English-language daily newspaper available in the city. The most read Tamil-language daily morning newspapers include Dinamalar, Dina Thanthi, Dinamani and Dinakaran – all these newspapers have editions from Madurai. There are also daily Tamil evening newspapers like Tamil Murasu, Malai Murasu and Maalai Malar published in Madurai. Television broadcasting from Chennai for whole of Tamil Nadu was started on 15 August 1975. Direct-to-home cable television services are provided by DD Direct Plus and other private service providers.

Electricity supply to the city is regulated and distributed by the Tamil Nadu Electricity Board (TNEB). The city is the headquarters of the Madurai region of TNEB and along with its suburbs, forms the Madurai Metro Electricity Distribution Circle, which is further divided into six divisions. Water supply is provided by the Madurai City Corporation with overhead tanks and power pumps. In the period 2010–2011, a total of 950.6 lakh litres of water was supplied to 87,091 connections for households in Madurai.

About 400 metric tonnes of solid waste are collected from the city every day by door-to-door collection, and the subsequent source segregation and dumping is carried out by the sanitary department of the Madurai Municipal corporation All the major channels in Madurai are linked by the corporation to receive the flood water from primary, secondary and tertiary drains constructed along the roadsides to dispose of rain water. The sewer system was first established by the British in Madurai in 1924 to cover the core city area, which covers 30 per cent of the present city area. It was further expanded in 1959 and 1983 by a corporation plan. The 2011 Jawaharlal Nehru National Urban Renewal Mission covered 90 per cent of households with underground drainage system.

Madurai comes under the Madurai telecom district of the Bharat Sanchar Nigam Limited (BSNL), India's state-owned telecom and internet services provider. Both Global System for Mobile Communications (GSM) and Code division multiple access (CDMA) mobile services are available. Apart from telecom, BSNL also provides broadband internet service and Caller Line Identification (CLI) based internet service Netone.

A regional passport office was opened on 17 December 2007 and caters to the needs of nine districts. The city is served by the Government Rajaji Hospital. A branch of All India Institutes of Medical Sciences in Thoppur, in the outskirts of the city, is set to be completed by 2022 as per Central government press release.

See also
 Madurai metropolitan area
 Thalaivankottai
 Vaigai Dam
 Athisayam Theme park

Footnotes

References

Sources

External links

 Official government website of Madurai District
 Tamilnadu Chamber of Commerce and Industry, Madurai

Madurai
Metropolitan cities in India
World Digital Library
Ancient Indian cities
Former capital cities in India
Populated places established in the 3rd century BC
3rd-century BC establishments in India
Smart cities in India